Bléré is a commune in the Indre-et-Loire department in central France.

Geography

Cultural surroundings 
Bléré, in the administrative region of "Centre Val-de-Loire", is located 27 km from Tours, 225 km southwest of Paris, and is close to the great châteaux of the Loire Valley. It is close to:

 7 km west of Chenonceaux;
 10 km south of Amboise;
 14 km east of Montlouis-sur-Loire;
 17 km west of Montrichard.

The town of Bléré is located in the Cher valley and in a rather wooded agricultural and wine region.

Transport Network

Main highways 
The A85 motorway goes through the south of the city connecting the cities of Angers and Vierzon, its exit 11 allows you to reach the city.

The A10 (or E60) motorway passes through the town of Auzouer-en-Touraine 30.5 km from Bléré.

Connections to intercity road and rail connections 
Bléré-La Croix is a train station served by the TER Centre-Val de Loire connecting the cities of Tours, Bléré, Saint-Aignan, Vierzon, Bourges and Nevers.

Line D of the interurban mobility network (or REMI) connecting the Bléré-Tours terminals serves four stops in Bléré.

Population

See also
Communes of the Indre-et-Loire department

References

Communes of Indre-et-Loire
Touraine